Yohan Croizet (born 15 February 1992) is a French professional footballer who plays for Újpest FC in the Hungarian Nemzeti Bajnokság I.

Club career

Croizet made his senior debut for Ligue 2 side Metz in the 1–0 away win at Guingamp on 12 August 2011, playing 82 minutes before being substituted for fellow debutant Teddy Kayombo. Croizet subsequently returned to the reserve team, and made 10 appearances in the Championnat de France amateur during the first five months of the 2011–12 campaign. He scored seven goals in 57 matches for Metz from 2011 to 2013, when he moved to Belgian second division club RE Virton. He moved to first-division club OH Leuven in 2014, then joined Mechelen in 2016.

Sporting Kansas City 
On 15 December 2017, Croizet signed as a designated player with American MLS side Sporting Kansas City. He scored his first goal for the club in a 6-0 thrashing of Vancouver Whitecaps FC on April 20, 2018 before netting a dramatic late winner with a stunning volley to win a Lamar Hunt U.S. Open Cup Round of 16 match against FC Dallas 3-2 on June 16, 2018. Croizet netted his first MLS game-winner for the club in a 2-0 win over Minnesota United FC at Children's Mercy Park on August 25, 2018.

Sporting KC and Croizet mutually agreed to part ways on 23 September 2019.

Career statistics

References

External links

Yohan Croizet profile at FootNational

1992 births
Living people
People from Sarrebourg
French footballers
French expatriate footballers
Association football defenders
Sportspeople from Moselle (department)
FC Metz players
R.E. Virton players
Oud-Heverlee Leuven players
K.V. Mechelen players
Sporting Kansas City players
Újpest FC players
Ligue 2 players
Belgian Pro League players
Challenger Pro League players
Nemzeti Bajnokság I players
Designated Players (MLS)
Major League Soccer players
Expatriate footballers in Belgium
Expatriate footballers in Hungary
Expatriate soccer players in the United States
French expatriate sportspeople in Belgium
French expatriate sportspeople in Hungary
French expatriate sportspeople in the United States
Footballers from Grand Est